Rubus kennedyanus is a rare North American species of brambles in the rose family. It is found in eastern Canada (Québec and Newfoundland) and in the north-central United States (Minnesota, Michigan, Wisconsin).

Rubus kennedyanus is a bristly shrub. Leaves are compound with 3 or 5 egg-shaped leaflets, each leaflet with a distinctive long, narrow tip at the end. Flowers are in small groups of 1–3.

The genetics of Rubus is extremely complex, so that it is difficult to decide on which groups should be recognized as species. There are many rare species with limited ranges such as this. Further study is suggested to clarify the taxonomy.

References

kennedyanus
Flora of the Great Lakes region (North America)
Flora of Michigan
Flora of Minnesota
Flora of Wisconsin
Flora of Newfoundland
Flora of Quebec
Plants described in 1931
Flora without expected TNC conservation status